Big Lapati is a village in the Nicobar district of Andaman and Nicobar Islands, India. It is located in the Car Nicobar tehsil, near Small Lapati.

Demographics 

According to the 2011 census of India, Big Lapati has 271 households. The effective literacy rate (i.e. the literacy rate of population excluding children aged 6 and below) is 76.27%.

References 

Villages in Car Nicobar tehsil